Yen Show-tzu (born 19 October 1971) is a Taiwanese softball player. She competed at the 1996 Summer Olympics and the 2004 Summer Olympics.

References

External links
 

1971 births
Living people
Sportspeople from Taichung
Taiwanese softball players
Olympic softball players of Taiwan
Softball players at the 1996 Summer Olympics
Softball players at the 2004 Summer Olympics
Asian Games medalists in softball
Softball players at the 1990 Asian Games
Softball players at the 1994 Asian Games
Softball players at the 2002 Asian Games
Medalists at the 1990 Asian Games
Medalists at the 1994 Asian Games
Medalists at the 2002 Asian Games
Asian Games silver medalists for Chinese Taipei
Asian Games bronze medalists for Chinese Taipei